Scrotal (or transscrotal) ultrasound is a medical ultrasound examination of the scrotum. It is used in the evaluation of testicular pain, and can help identify solid masses.

Indications
Although the development of new imaging modalities such as computerized tomography and magnetic resonance imaging have opened a new era for medical imaging, high-resolution sonography remains as the initial imaging modality of choice for evaluation of scrotal
disease. Many of the disease processes, such as testicular torsion, epididymo-orchitis, and intratesticular tumor, produce the common symptom of pain at presentation, and differentiation of these conditions and disorders is important for determining the
appropriate treatment. High-resolution ultrasound helps in better characterize some of the intrascrotal lesions, and suggest a more specific diagnosis, resulting in more appropriate treatments and avoiding unnecessary operation for some of the diseases.

Imaging technique
For any scrotal examination, thorough palpation of the scrotal contents and history taking
should precede the sonographic examination. Patients are usually examined in the supine
position with a towel draped over their thighs to support the scrotum. Warm gel should
always be used because cold gel can elicit a cremasteric response resulting in thickening of
the scrotal wall; hence a thorough examination is difficult to be performed. A high
resolution, near-focused, linear array transducer with a frequency of 7.5 MHz or greater is
often used because it provides increased resolutions of the scrotal contents. Images of both
scrotum and bilateral inguinal regions are obtained in both transverse and longitudinal
planes. Color Doppler and pulsed Doppler examination are subsequently performed,
optimized to display low-flow velocities, to demonstrate blood flow in the testes and
surrounding scrotal structures. In evaluation of acute scrotum, the asymptomatic side
should be scanned first to ensure that the flow parameters are set appropriately. A
transverse image including all or a portion of both testicles in the field of view is obtained to
allow side-to-side comparison of their sizes, echogenicity, and vascularity. Additional views
may also be obtained with the patient performing Valsalva maneuver.

Anatomy

The normal adult testis is an ovoid structure measuring 3 cm in anterior-posterior
dimension, 2–4 cm in width, and 3–5 cm in length. The weight of each testis normally ranges
from 12.5 to 19 g. Both the sizes and weights of the testes normally decrease with age. At
ultrasound, the normal testis has a homogeneous, medium-level, granular echotexture. The
testicle is surrounded by a dense white fibrous capsule, the tunica albuginea, which is often
not visualized in the absence of intrascrotal fluid. However, the tunica is often seen as an
echogenic structure where it invaginates into the testis to form the mediastinum testis. In the testis, the seminiferous tubules converge to form the rete testes, which is
located in the mediastinum testis. The rete testis connects to the epididymal head via the
efferent ductules. The epididymis is located posterolateral to the testis and measures 6–7 cm
in length. At sonography, the epididymis is normally iso- or slightly hyperechoic to the
normal testis and its echo texture may be coarser. The head is the largest and most easily
identified portion of the epididymis. It is located superolateral to the upper pole of the
testicle and is often seen on paramedian views of the testis. The normal epididymal
body and tail are smaller and more variable in position.

The testis obtains its blood supply from the deferential, cremasteric and testicular arteries.
The right and left testicular arteries, branches of the abdominal aorta, arise just distal to the
renal arteries, provide the primary vascular supply to the testes. They course through the
inguinal canal with the spermatic cord to the posterior superior aspect of the testis. Upon
reaching the testis, the testicular artery divides into branches, which penetrate the tunica
albuginea and arborize over the surface of the testis in a layer known as tunica vasculosa.
Centripetal branches arising from the capsular arteries carry blood toward the mediastinum,
where they divide to form the recurrent rami that carry blood away from the mediastinum
into the testis. The deferential artery, a branch of the superior vesicle artery and the
cremasteric artery, a branch of the inferior epigastric artery, supply the epididymis, vas
deferens, and peritesticular tissue.

Four testicular appendages have been described: the appendix testis, the appendix
epididymis, the vas aberrans, and the paradidymis. They are all remnants of embryonic
ducts. Among them, the appendix testis and the appendix epididymis are usually seen at scrotal US. The appendix testis is a
Müllerian duct remnant and consists of fibrous tissue and blood vessels within an envelope
of columnar epithelium. The appendix testis is attached to the upper pole of the testis and
found in the groove between the testis and the epididymis. The appendix epididymis is
attached to the head of the epididymis. The spermatic cord, which begins at the deep
inguinal ring and descends vertically into the scrotum consists of vas deferens, testicular
artery, cremasteric artery, deferential artery, pampiniform plexuses, genitofemoral nerve,
and lymphatic vessel.

Intratesticular tumors
One of the primary indications for scrotal sonography is to evaluate for the presence of
intratesticular tumor in the setting of scrotal enlargement or a palpable abnormality at
physical examination. It is well known that the presence of a solitary intratesticular solid
mass is highly suspicious for malignancy. Conversely, the vast majority of extratesticular
lesions are benign.

Germ cell tumors
Primary intratesticular malignancy can be divided into germ cell tumors and non–germ cell
tumors. Germ cell tumors are further categorized as either seminomas or nonseminomatous
tumors. Other malignant testicular tumors include those of gonadal stromal origin,
lymphoma, leukemia, and metastases.

Seminoma

Approximately 95% of malignant testicular tumors are germ cell tumors, of which
seminoma is the most common. It accounts for 35%–50% of all germ cell tumors. Seminomas occur in a slightly older age group when compared with other nonseminomatous tumor, with a peak incidence in the fourth and fifth decades. They are less
aggressive than other testicular tumors and usually confined within the tunica albuginea at
presentation. Seminomas are associated with the best prognosis of the germ cell tumors
because of their high sensitivity to radiation and chemotherapy.

Seminoma is the most common tumor type in cryptorchid testes. The risk of developing a
seminoma is increased in patients with cryptorchidism, even after orchiopexy. There is an
increased incidence of malignancy developing in the contralateral testis too, hence
sonography is sometimes used to screen for an occult tumor in the remaining testis.
On US images, seminomas are generally uniformly hypoechoic, larger tumors may be more
heterogeneous [Fig. 3]. Seminomas are usually confined by the tunica albuginea and rarely
extend to peritesticular structures. Lymphatic spread to retroperitoneal lymph nodes and
hematogenous metastases to lung, brain, or both are evident in about 25% of patients at the
time of presentation.

Nonseminomatous germ cell tumors
Nonseminomatous germ cell tumors most often affect men in their third decades of life.
Histologically, the presence of any nonseminomatous cell types in a testicular germ cell
tumor classifies it as a nonseminomatous tumor, even if most of the tumor cells belong to
seminoma. These subtypes include yolk sac tumor, embryonal cell carcinoma, teratocarcinoma,
teratoma, and choriocarcinoma. Clinically nonsemionatous tumors usually present as mixed
germ cell tumors with various cell types and in different proportions.

Embryonal cell carcinoma

Embryonal cell carcinomas, a more aggressive tumor than
seminoma usually occurs in men in their 30s. Although it is the second most common
testicular tumor after seminoma, pure embryonal cell carcinoma is rare and constitutes only
about 3 percent of the nonseminomatous germ cell tumors. Most of the cases occur in
combination with other cell types.
At ultrasound, embryonal cell carcinomas are predominantly hypoechoic lesions with ill-defined margins and an inhomogeneous echotexture. Echogenic foci due to hemorrhage,
calcification, or fibrosis are commonly seen. Twenty percent of embryonal cell carcinomas
have cystic components. The tumor may invade into the tunica albuginea
resulting in contour distortion of the testis [Fig. 4].

Yolk sac tumor
Yolk sac tumors also known as endodermal sinus tumors account for 80%
of childhood testicular tumors, with most cases occurring before the age of 2 years. Alpha-fetoprotein is normally
elevated in greater than 90% of patients with yolk sac tumor (Woodward et al., 2002, as cited
in Ulbright et al., 1999). In its pure form, yolk sac tumor is rare in adults; however yolk sac
elements are frequently seen in tumors with mixed histologic features in adults and thus
indicate poor prognosis. The US appearance of yolk sac tumor is usually nonspecific and
consists of inhomogeneous mass that may contain echogenic foci secondary to hemorrhage.
Choriocarcinoma --- Choriocarcinoma is a highly malignant testicular tumor that usually
develops in the 2nd and 3rd decades of life. Pure choriocarcinomas are rare and represent
only less than 1 percent of all testicular tumors. Choriocarcinomas
are composed of both cytotrophoblasts and syncytiotrophoblasts, with the latter responsible
for the clinical elevation of human chorionic gonadotrophic hormone levels. As microscopic
vascular invasion is common in choriocarcinoma, hematogeneous metastasis, especially to
the lungs is common. Many
choriocarcinomas show extensive hemorrhagic necrosis in the central portion of the tumor;
this appears as mixed cystic and solid components at ultrasound.

Teratoma
Although teratoma is the second most common testicular tumor in children, it
affects all age groups. Mature teratoma in children is often benign, but teratoma in adults,
regardless of age, should be considered malignant. Teratomas are composed of all three
germ cell layers, i.e. endoderm, mesoderm and ectoderm. At ultrasound, teratomas
generally form well-circumscribed complex masses. Echogenic foci representing
calcification, cartilage, immature bone and fibrosis are commonly seen [Fig. 5]. Cysts are
also a common feature and depending on the contents of the cysts i.e. serous, mucoid or
keratinous fluid, it may present as anechoic or complex structure [Fig. 6].

Non-germ cell tumours

Sex cord-stromal tumours
Sex cord-stromal (gonadal stromal) tumors of the testis, account for 4 per cent of all
testicular tumors. The most common are Leydig and Sertoli cell tumors.
Although the majority of these tumors are benign, these tumors can produce hormonal
changes, for example, Leydig cell tumor in a child may produce isosexual virilization. In
adult, it may have no endocrine manifestation or gynecomastia, and decrease in libido may
result from production of estrogens. These tumors are typically small and are usually
discovered incidentally. They do not have any specific ultrasound appearance but appear as
well-defined hypoechoic lesions. These tumors are usually removed because they cannot be
distinguished from malignant germ cell tumors.

Leydig cell tumors are the most common type of sex cord–stromal tumor of the testis,
accounting for 1%–3% of all testicular tumors. They can be seen in any age group, they are
generally small solid masses, but they may show cystic areas, hemorrhage, or necrosis. Their sonographic appearance is
variable and is indistinguishable from that of germ cell tumors.

Sertoli cell tumors are less common, constituting less than 1% of testicular tumors. They are
less likely than Leydig cell tumors to be hormonally active, but gynecomastia can occur. Sertoli cell tumors are typically well-circumscribed, unilateral, round to lobulated masses.

Lymphoma

Clinically lymphoma can manifest in one of three ways: as the primary site of involvement,
or as a secondary tumor such as the initial manifestation of clinically occult disease or
recurrent disease. Although lymphomas constitute 5% of testicular tumors and are almost
exclusively diffuse non-Hodgkin B-cell tumors, only less than 1% of non-Hodgkin
lymphomas involve the testis.

Patients with testicular lymphoma are usually old aged around 60 years of age, present with
painless testicular enlargement and less commonly with other systemic symptoms such as
weight loss, anorexia, fever and weakness. Bilateral testicle involvements are common and
occur in 8.5% to 18% of cases. At sonography, most lymphomas are homogeneous and diffusely replace the testis [Fig. 7].
However focal hypoechoic lesions can occur, hemorrhage and necrosis are rare. At times,
the sonographic appearance of lymphoma is indistinguishable from that of the germ cell
tumors [Fig. 8], then the patient's age at presentation, symptoms, and medical history, as
well as multiplicity and bilaterality of the lesions, are all important factors in making the
appropriate diagnosis.

Leukemia
Primary leukemia of the testis is rare. However, due to the presence of blood-testis barrier,
chemotherapeutic agents are unable to reach the testis, hence in boys with acute
lymphoblastic leukemia, testicular involvement is reported in 5% to 10% of patients, with
the majority found during clinical remission. The sonographic
appearance of leukemia of the testis can be quite varied, as the tumors may be unilateral or
bilateral, diffuse or focal, hypoechoic or hyperechoic. These findings
are usually indistinguishable from that of the lymphoma [Fig. 9].

Epidermoid cyst

Epidermoid cysts, also known as keratocysts, are benign epithelial tumors which usually occur in the second to fourth decades and accounts for only 1–2% of all intratesticular tumors. As these tumors have a benign biological behavior and with no malignant potential,
preoperative recognition of this tumor is important as this will lead to testicle preserving
surgery (enucleation) rather than unnecessary orchiectomy.
Clinically, epidermoid cyst cannot be differentiated from other testicular tumors, typically
presenting as a non-tender, palpable, solitary intratesticular mass. Tumor markers such as
serum beta-human chorionic gonadotropin and alpha-feto protein are negative.
The ultrasound patterns of epidermoid cysts are variable and include:
 A mass with a target appearance, i.e. a central hypoechoic area surrounded by an
echolucent rim;
 An echogenic mass with dense acoustic shadowing due to calcification;
 A well-circumscribed mass with a hyperechoic rim;
 Mixed pattern having heterogeneous echotexture and poor-defined contour and
 An onion peel appearance consisting of alternating rings of hyperechogenicities and
hypoechogenicities.

However, these patterns, except the latter one, may be considered as non-specific as
heterogeneous echotexture and shadowing calcification can also be detected in malignant
testicular tumors. The onion peel pattern of epidermoid cyst [Fig. 10]
correlates well with the pathologic finding of multiple layers of keratin debris produced by
the lining of the epidermoid cyst. This sonographic appearance should be considered
characteristic of an epidermoid cyst and corresponds to the natural evolution of the cyst.
Absence of vascular flow is another important feature that is helpful in differentiation of
epidermoid cyst from other solid intratesticular lesions.

Extratesticular tumors
Although most of the extratesticular lesions are benign, malignancy does occur; the most
common malignant tumors in infants and children are rhabdomyosarcomas. Other malignant tumors include liposarcoma, leiomyosarcoma, malignant fibrous histiocytoma and mesothelioma.

Rhabdomyosarcoma

Rhabdomyosarcoma is the most common tumor of the lower genitourinary tract in children in
the first two decades, it may develop anywhere in the body, and 4% occur in the paratesticular
region which carries a better outcome than lesions elsewhere in the genitourinary tract. Clinically, the patient usually presents with non-specific complaints of a unilateral, painless intrascrotal swelling not associated with fever.

Transillumination test is positive when a hydrocele is present, often resulting in a
misdiagnosis of epididymitis, which is more commonly associated with hydrocele.
The ultrasound findings of paratesticular rhabdomyosarcoma are variable. It usually
presents as an echo-poor mass [Fig. 11a] with or without hydrocele. With color Doppler sonography these tumors are generally hypervascular.

Mesothelioma

Malignant mesothelioma is an uncommon tumor arising in body cavities lined by
mesothelium. The majority of these tumors are found in the pleura, peritoneum and less
frequently pericardium. As the tunica vaginalis is a layer of reflected peritoneum,
mesothelioma can occur in the scrotal sac. Although trauma, herniorrhaphy and long term
hydrocele have been considered as the predisposing factors for development of malignant mesothelioma, the only well
established risk factor is asbestos exposure. Patients with
malignant mesothelioma of the tunica vaginalis frequently have a progressively enlarging
hydrocele and less frequently a scrotal mass, rapid re-accumulation of fluid after aspiration
raises the suggestion of malignancy.

The reported ultrasound features of mesothelioma of the tunica vaginalis testis are variable.
Hydrocele, either simple or complex is present and may be associated with:
 multiple extratesticular papillary projections of mixed echogenicity;
 multiple extratesticular nodular masses of increased echogenicity;
 focal irregular thickening of the tunica vaginalis testis; (4) a simple
hydrocele as the only finding and
 A single hypoechoic mass located in the epididymal head. With color Doppler sonography, mesothelioma is hypovascular [Fig. 12].

Leiomyoma

Leiomyomas are benign neoplasms that may arise from any structure or organ containing
smooth muscle. The majority of genitourinary leiomyomas are found in the renal capsule,
but this tumor has also been reported in the epididymis, spermatic cord, and tunica
albuginea. Scrotal leiomyomas have been reported in patients from the fourth to ninth
decades of life with most presenting during the fifth decade. These tumors are generally
slow growth and asymptomatic. The sonographic features of leiomyomas have been
reported as solid hypoechoic or heterogeneous masses that may or may not contain
shadowing calcification. Other findings include whorl shaped configuration [Fig. 13a] of the nodule and multiple, narrow areas of shadowing not cast by calcifications [Fig. 13b], but corresponding to transition zones between the various tissue components of the mass are characteristic of leiomyoma and may help
differentiate it from other scrotal tumors.

Fat containing tumors

Lipoma

Lipoma is the most common nontesticular intrascrotal tumor. It can be divided into 3 types
depending upon the site of origination and spread:
 Originating in the spermatic cord with spread to the scrotum;
 Originating and developing within the cord (most common type) and
 Originating and developing within the scrotum.

At ultrasound, lipoma is a well–defined, homogeneous, hyperechoic paratesticular lesion of
varying size [Fig. 14]. The simple finding of an echogenic fatty mass within the inguinal
canal, while suggestive of a lipoma, should also raise a question of fat from the omentum
secondary to an inguinal hernia. However lipomas are well-defined masses, whereas
herniated omentum appears to be more elongated and can be traced to the inguinal area,
hence scanning along the inguinal canal as well as the scrotum is necessary to make the
differential diagnosis. Magnetic resonance imaging and computerized tomography are
helpful in doubtful cases.

Liposarcoma
Malignant extratesticular tumors are rare. Most of the malignant tumors are solid and have
nonspecific features on ultrasonography. The majority of the malignant extratesticular
tumors arise from spermatic cord with liposarcoma being the most common in adults. On gross specimen, liposarcoma is a solid, bulky lipomatous tumor
with heterogeneous architecture, often containing areas of calcification. Although the sonographic appearances of liposarcoma are variable and nonspecific, it
still provides a clue about the presence of lipomatous matrix. Echogenic areas corresponding
to fat often associated with poor sound transmission and areas of heterogeneous
echogenicity corresponding to nonlipomatous component are present. Some
liposarcomas may also mimic the sonographic appearance of lipomas [Fig. 16] and hernias
that contain omentum, but lipomas are generally smaller and more homogeneous and
hernias are elongated masses that can often be traced back to the inguinal canal. CT and MR
imaging are more specific, as they can easily recognize fatty component along with other
soft tissue component more clearly than ultrasound.

Adenomatoid tumor

Adenomatoid tumors are the most common tumors of the epididymis and account for
approximately 30% of all paratesticular neoplasms, second only to lipoma. They are usually unilateral, more common on the left side, and usually involve the
epididymal tail. Adenomatoid tumor typically occurs in men during the third and fourth
decades of life. Patients usually present with a painless scrotal mass that is smooth, round
and well circumscribed on palpation. They are believed to be of mesothelial origin and are
universally benign. Their sonographic appearance is that of a round-shaped, well-defined,
homogeneous mass with echogenicity ranging from hypo- to iso- to hyperechoic.

Fibrous pseudotumor
Fibrous pseudotumors, also known as fibromas are thought to be reactive, nonneoplastic
lesions. They can occur at any age, about 50% of fibromas are associated with hydrocele, and
30% are associated with a history of trauma or inflammation (Akbar et al., 2003). Although
the exact cause of this tumor is not completely understood, it is generally believed that these
lesions represent a benign reactive proliferation of inflammatory and fibrous tissue, in
response to chronic irritation.
Sonographic evaluation generally shows one or more solid nodules arising from the tunica
vaginalis, epididymis, spermatic cord and tunica albuginea [Fig. 18]. A hydrocele is frequently
present too. The nodules may appear hypoechoic or hyperechoic, depending on the amount of collagen or fibroblast present.
Acoustic shadowing may occur in the absence of calcification due to the dense collagen
component of this tumor. With color Doppler sonography, a small to moderate amount of
vascularity may be seen [Fig. 19].

Inflammation

Epididymitis and epididymo-orchitis

Epididymitis and epididymo-orchitis are common causes of acute scrotal pain in adolescent
boys and adults. At physical examination, they usually are palpable as tender and enlarged
structures. Clinically, this disease can be differentiated from torsion of the spermatic cord by
elevation of the testes above the pubic symphysis. If scrotal pain decreases, it is more likely
to be due to epidiymitis rather than torsion (Prehn's sign). Most cases of epididymitis are
secondary to sexually transmitted disease or retrograde bacteria infection from the urinary
bladder.
The infection usually begins in the epididymal tail and spreads to the epididymal
body and head. Approximately 20% to 40% of cases are associated with orchitis due to
direct spread of infection into the testis.

At ultrasound, the findings of acute epididymitis include an enlarged hypoechoic or
hyperechoic (presumably secondary to hemorrhage) epididymis [Fig. 20a]. Other signs of
inflammation such as increased vascularity, reactive hydrocele, pyocele and scrotal wall
thickening may also be present. Testicular involvement is confirmed by the presence of
testicular enlargement and an inhomogeneous echotexture. Hypervascularity on color
Doppler images [Fig. 20b] is a well-established diagnostic criterion and may be the only
imaging finding of epididymo-orchitis in some men.

Tuberculous epididymo-orchitis

Although the genitourinary tract is the most common site of extra-pulmonary involvement
by tuberculosis, tuberculous infection of the scrotum is rare and occurs in approximately 7%
of patients with tuberculosis. At the
initial stage of infection, the epididymis alone is involved. However, if appropriate
antituberculous treatment is not administered promptly, the infection will spread to the
ipsilateral testis. The occurrence of isolated testicular tuberculosis is rare. Clinically patients with tuberculous epididymo-orchitis may present with painful or painless enlargement of the scrotum, hence they cannot be distinguished from lesions such as testicular tumor, testicular infarction and may mimic testicular torsion.

At ultrasound, tuberculous epididymitis is characterized by an enlarged epididymis with
variable echogenicity. The presence of calcification, caseation necrosis, granulomas and
fibrosis can result in heterogeneous echogenicity [Fig. 21a]. The ultrasound findings of
tuberculous orchitis are as follow: (a) diffusely enlarged heterogeneously hypoechoic testis
(b) diffusely enlarged homogeneously hypoechoic testis (c) nodular enlarged
heterogeneously hypoechoic testis and (d) presence of multiple small hypoechoic nodules in
an enlarged testis [Fig. 21b].

Although both bacterial and tuberculous infections may involve both the epididymis and
the testes, an enlarged epididymis with heterogeneously hypoechoic pattern favors a
diagnosis of tuberculosis (Muttarak and Peh, 2006, as cited in Kim et al., 1993 and Chung et al., 1997). With color Doppler ultrasound, a diffuse increased blood flow pattern is seen in
bacterial epididymitis, whereas focal linear or spotty blood flow signals are seen in the
peripheral zone of the affected epididymis in patients with tuberculosis.

Fournier gangrene

Fournier gangrene is a polymicrobial necrotizing fasciitis involving the perineal, perianal, or
genital regions and constitutes a true surgical emergency with a potentially high mortality
rate. It usually develops from a perineal or genitourinary infection but can arise following
local trauma with secondary infection of the wound. 40–60% of patients are being diabetic.
Although the diagnosis of Fournier gangrene is often made clinically, diagnostic imaging is
useful in ambiguous cases.
The sonographic hallmark of Fournier gangrene is presence of subcutaneous gas within the
thickened scrotal wall. At ultrasound, the gas appears as numerous, discrete, hyperechoic
foci with reverberation artifacts [Fig. 22]. Evidence of gas within the scrotal wall may be
seen prior to clinical crepitus. The only other condition manifesting with gas at sonographic
examination is an inguinoscrotal hernia. This can be differentiated from Fournier gangrene
by the presence of gas within the protruding bowel lumen and away from the scrotal wall.
(Levenson et al., 2008).

Other benign lesions of the scrotum

Tubular ectasia

The normal testis consists of several hundred lobules, with each lobule containing several
seminiferous tubules. The seminiferous tubules of each lobule merge to form the straight
tubes, which in turn converge to form the rete testis. The rete testis tubules, which lie within
the mediastinum testis, are an anastomosing network of irregular channels with a broad
lumen, which then empties into the efferent ductules to give rise to the head of the
epididymis. Obstruction in the epididymis or efferent ductules may lead to cystic dilatation
of the efferent ductules, which usually presents as an epididymal cyst on ultrasound.
However, in the more proximal portion this could lead to the formation of an intratesticular
cyst or dilatation of the tubules, so-called tubular ectasia. Factors contributing to the
development of tubular ectasia include epididymitis, testicular biopsy, vasectomy or an
aging process. Clinically this lesion is usually asymptomatic. The
ultrasound appearance of a microcystic or multiple tubular-like lesions located at the
mediastinal testis [Fig. 23] and associated with an epididymal cyst in a middle-aged or
elderly patient should alert the sonographer to the possibility of tubular ectasia.
The differential diagnosis of a multicystic lesion in testis should include a cystic tumor,
especially a cystic teratoma. A cystic teratoma is usually a palpable lesion containing both
solid and cystic components; and the cysts are normally larger than that of tubular ectasia,
which appear microcystic [Fig. 24]. Furthermore, the location of tubular ectasia in the
mediastinum testis is also helpful in making the differential diagnosis.

Testicular microlithiasis
Histologically, testicular microlithiasis refers to the scattered laminated calcium deposits in
the lumina of the seminiferous tubules. These calcifications arise from degeneration of the
cells lining the seminiferous tubules. At ultrasonography, microliths appear as tiny punctate
echogenic foci, which typically do not shadow. Although minor microcalcification within a
testis is considered normal, the typical US appearance of testicular microlithiasis is of
multiple nonshadowing echogenic foci measuring 2–3 mm and randomly scattered
throughout the testicular parenchyma [Fig. 25] (Dogra et al., 2003, as cited in Janzen et al.,
1992). The clinical significance of testicular microlithiasis is that it is associated with
increased risk of testicular malignancy, thus follow up of affected individuals with scrotal
sonography is necessary to ensure that a testicular tumor does not develop.

Testicular torsion

The normal testis and epididymis are anchored to the scrotal wall. If there is a lack of
development of these attachments, the testis is free to twist on its vascular pedicle. This will
result in torsion of the spermatic cord and interruption of testicular blood flow. Testicular
torsion occurs most commonly at 12 to 18 years but can occur at any age. Torsion results in
swelling and edema of the testis, and as the edema increases, testicular perfusion is further
altered. The extent of testicular ischemia depends on the degree of torsion, which ranges
from 180° to 720° or greater. The testicular salvage rate depends on the degree of torsion and
the duration of ischemia. A nearly 100% salvage rate exists within the first 6 hours after the
onset of symptoms; a 70% rate, within 6–12 hours; and a 20% rate, within 12–24 hours. Therefore, testicular torsion is a surgical emergency and the role of ultrasound is to differentiate it from epididymitis as both disease
presents with acute testicular pain clinically.

There are two types of testicular torsion: extravaginal and intravaginal. Extravaginal torsion
occurs exclusively in newborns. Ultrasound findings include an enlarged heterogeneous
testis, ipsilateral hydrocele, thickened scrotal wall and absence of vascular flow in the testis
and spermatic cord. The ultrasound findings of intravaginal torsion vary with the duration and the degree of rotation of the spermatic cord. Gray scale ultrasound may appear normal if the torsion just occurs. At 4–6 hours
after onset of torsion, enlarged testis with decreased echogenicity is seen. At 24 hours after
onset, the testis appears heterogeneous due to vascular congestion, hemorrhage and
infarction. As gray scale ultrasound is often normal during early onset of
torsion, Doppler sonography is considered essential in early diagnosis of testicular
torsion. The absence of testicular flow at color and power Doppler ultrasound is considered
diagnostic of ischemia, provided that the scanner is set for detection of slow flow,
the sampling box is small and the scanner is adjusted for the lowest repetition frequency
and the lowest possible threshold setting.

Varicocele

Varicocele refers to abnormal dilatation of the veins of the spermatic cord due to
incompetence of valve in the spermatic vein. This results in impaired blood drainage into
the spermatic vein when the patient assumes a standing position or during Valsalva's
maneuver. Varicoceles are more common on the left side due to the following reasons (a)
The left testicular vein is longer; (b) the left testicular vein enters the left renal vein at a right
angle; (c) the left testicular artery in some men arches over the left renal vein, thereby
compressing it; and (d) the descending colon distended with feces may compress the left
testicular vein.

The US appearance of varicocele consists of multiple, hypoechoic, serpiginous, tubular like
structures of varying sizes larger than 2 mm in diameter that is usually best visualized
superior or lateral to the testis [Fig. 27a]. Color flow and duplex Doppler US optimized for
low-flow velocities help confirm the venous flow pattern, with phasic variation and
retrograde filling during a Valsalva's maneuver [Fig. 27b]. Intratesticular varicocele may
appear as a vague hypoechoic area in the testis or mimics tubular ectasia. With color
Doppler, this intratesticular hypoechoic area also showed reflux of vascular flow during
Valsalva's maneuver [Fig. 28].

Undescended testis
Normally the testes begin its descent through the inguinal canal to the scrotum at 36 weeks’
of gestation and completed at birth. Failure in the course of testes descent will result in
undescended testes (Cryptorchidism).

Undescended testis is found in 4% of full-term infants but only 0.8% of
males at the age of 1 year have true cryptorchidism. Although an undescended testis can be
found anywhere along the pathway of descent from the retroperitoneum to the scrotum, the
inguinal canal is the most common site for an undescended testis. Deviation of testis from
the normal pathway of descent will result in ectopic testis that is commonly seen in
pubopenile, femoral triangle and perineal regions.

Besides infertility, undescended testes carry an increased risk of malignancy even for the
normally located contralateral testis. The risk of malignancy is estimated to be as high as 10 times the normal individual with seminoma being the most common malignancy.

The incidence of infertility is decreased if surgical orchiopexy is carried out before the 1–3 years
but the risk of malignancy does not change.
Because of the superficial location of the inguinal canal in children, sonography of
undescended testes should be performed with a high frequency transducer. At ultrasound,
the undescended testis usually appears small, less echogenic than the contralateral normal
testis and usually located in the inguinal region [Fig. 29]. With color Doppler, the vascularity
of the undescended testis is poor.

Testicular appendiceal torsion

At sonography, the appendix testis usually appears as a 5 mm ovoid structure located in the
groove between the testis and the epididymis. Normally it is isoechoic to the testis but at
times it may be cystic. The appendix epididymis is of the same size as the appendix testis
but is more often pedunculated. Clinically pain may occur with torsion of either appendage.
Physical examination showed a small, firm nodule is palpable on the superior aspect of the
testis and a bluish discoloration known as ‘‘blue dot’’ sign may be seen on the overlying
skin. Torsion of the appendiceal
testis most frequently involved in boys aged 7–14 years (Dogra and Bhatt 2004).
The sonographic features of testicular appendiceal torsion include a circular mass with
variable echogenicity located adjacent to the testis or epididymis [Fig. 30], reactive
hydrocele and skin thickening of the scrotum is common, increased peripheral vascular flow
may be found around the testicular appendage on color Doppler ultrasound. Surgical
intervention is unnecessary and pain usually resolves in 2 to 3 days with an atrophied or
calcified appendages remaining.

Hematocele

A scrotal hematocele is a collection of blood in the tunica vaginalis around the testicle. It can follow trauma (such as a straddle injury) or can be a complication of surgery. It is often accompanied by testicular pain. It has been reported in patients with hemophilia and following catheterization of the femoral artery. If the diagnosis is not clinically evident, transillumination (with a penlight against the scrotum) will show a non-translucent fluid inside the scrotum. Ultrasound imaging may also be useful in confirming the diagnosis. In severe or non-resolving cases, surgical incision and drainage may be required. To prevent recurrence following surgical drainage, a drain may be left at the surgical site.

Fibrotic striations

A striated pattern of the testicle, radiating from its mediastinum, does not have clinical importance unless there are alarming symptoms or abnormal signal on Doppler ultrasonography. It is presumed to represent fibrosis.

Conclusion
Ultrasound remains as the mainstay in scrotal imaging not only because of its high accuracy,
excellent depiction of scrotal anatomy, low cost and wide availability, it is also useful in
determining whether a mass is intra- or extra-testicular, thus providing us useful and
valuable information to decide whether a mass is benign or malignant even though
malignancy does occur in extratesticular tumors and vice versa. Furthermore, ultrasound also
provides information essential to reach a specific diagnosis in patients with testicular
torsion, testicular appendiceal torsion and inflammation such as epididymo-orchitis, Fournier gangrene etc., thus enabling us to avoid unnecessary operation.

See also
 Male infertility#Ultrasonography

References

Male genital procedures
Medical ultrasonography
Scrotum